Reameathiptei III (1692–1757), born Ang Tong, was a Cambodian king (r. 1747–1749, 1756–1757).

Ang Tong was a son-in-law of Thommo Reachea III. He struggled for power with Thommo Reachea IV and Ang Hing. Later he killed Ang Hing and ascended the throne. In 1749, the Vietnamese army invaded Cambodia and installed Satha II. Ang Tong fled to the Ayutthaya Kingdom.

Ang Tong was restored as king after Chey Chettha V's death. He died in Pursat in 1757. This time he was succeeded by his grandson Outey II.

References

Sources 
 Achille Dauphin-Meunier, Histoire du Cambodge, Que sais-je ? N° 916, P.U.F 1968.
 Anthony Stokvis, Manuel d'histoire, de généalogie et de chronologie de tous les États du globe, depuis les temps les plus reculés jusqu'à nos jours, préf. H. F. Wijnman, éditions Brill, Leyde 1888, réédition 1966, Volume 1 Part1: Asie, chapitre XIV §.9 « Kambodge » Listes et  tableau généalogique n°34  p. 337–338. 
 Peter Truhart, Regents of Nations, K.G Saur Münich, 1984–1988 , Art. « Kampuchea », p. 1732.

1692 births
1757 deaths
18th-century Cambodian monarchs